Preserved is the sixth album by Young Bleed. It was released on October 11, 2011, under Strange Lane Records.

Track listing

References

2011 albums
Young Bleed albums
Strange Music albums
Albums produced by Seven (record producer)